Michari (Miss-sHAR-I) is a violet and pink flower that can be found in Montego Bay, Jamaica.It is very rare and sacred and often worn as a design on the dress, and hair of Mami Wata, a goddess in the voodoo religion.

Voodoo